Ericymba is a genus of fish in the family Cyprinidae. They are native to North America. This genus is treated as a synonym of Notropis by some authorities.

Species
There are currently 2 recognized species in this genus:
 Ericymba amplamala (Pera & Armbruster, 2006) (Longjaw minnow)
 Ericymba buccata Cope, 1865 (Silverjaw minnow)

References